The White Sound is the directorial debut of Austrian director Hans Weingartner, with co-director and screenplay writer Tobias Amann. The film was the idea of both students as part of a separate project at the Academy of Media Arts Cologne. The film premiere was at Cinenova-Kino in Cologne-Ehrenfeld and the film appeared throughout German cinemas on 31 January 2002.

The film stars Daniel Brühl.

See also

List of films featuring hallucinogens

External links
 

2002 films
2002 drama films
German drama films
Films shot in Cologne
Films set in Cologne
Films directed by Hans Weingartner
Films about psychiatry
2000s German films